On 14 December 2021, the World Health Organization launched an investigation into an unknown disease that has resulted in at least 89 deaths in Fangak, Jonglei State, South Sudan. Symptoms of the disease were said to be cough, diarrhea, fever, headache, chest pain, joint pain, loss of appetite, and body weakness. As of the last report of the disease, in late December, 2021, 97 people had died of the disease.

History 
In early December, 2021, South Sudan's ministry of health reported dozens of deaths due to an unidentified illness. The reports came amidst severe flooding in the region and prompted the World Health Organization (WHO) to send rapid response team to collect samples of the disease. Initial samples tested negative for cholera.

References 

2021 in South Sudan
Disease outbreaks
2021 disease outbreaks
Disease outbreaks in South Sudan
Health disasters in South Sudan
Health in South Sudan